A bucket hat (variations of which include the fisherman's hat, Irish country hat and session hat) is a hat with a narrow, downward-sloping brim.  Typically, the hat is made from heavy-duty cotton fabric such as denim or canvas, or heavy wool such as tweed, sometimes with metal eyelets placed on the crown of the hat for ventilation.

It was first adopted as a high fashion item in the 1960s, and with subsequent revivals in both street fashion and on the catwalk. It is popular festival gear in the present day, also known as a "session hat" and is favored by fans of bands such as Sticky Fingers, The Stone Roses, King Gizzard & the Lizard Wizard, Oasis, Yung Lean, and The Courteeners.

Origins

The bucket hat or fishing hat is said to have been introduced around 1900. Originally made from wool felt or tweed cloth, these hats were traditionally worn by Irish farmers and fishermen as protection from the rain, because the lanolin from the unwashed (raw) wool made these hats naturally waterproof. From the interwar years onwards, these "Irish walking hats" were quickly adopted internationally for country pursuits because, when folded, they could fit inside a coat pocket. If the hat fell in the mud, it could be easily cleaned with a damp sponge, and it could be reshaped using steam from a kettle. In the 1960s, it was often worn by members of the Mod subculture.

The modern bucket hat is derived from a tropical hat made from olive drab cotton that was issued to the US Army during the Vietnam War. These lightweight hats became popular among civilians for use in sports such as fishing, and as sun protection.

Fashion accessory

In the 1960s, the bucket hat was adapted as a  ladies' fashion item, in common with the pillbox, bakerboy, and cloche styles, suiting the fashion for more bouffant hair. Milliners such as Lilly Daché created designs in felt or other stiffer fabrics to capture the "mod" look. The older tweed Irish walking hat remained popular among professional men until the 1970s, and was notably worn by Sean Connery's character in Indiana Jones and the Last Crusade.

The hat became popular with rappers in the 1980s and remained part of street fashion into the 1990s. More recently, it has re-emerged as a fashion catwalk item after being sported by celebrities such as Rihanna.

The bucket hat came to prominence during the 2022 FIFA World Cup in November 2022, particularly following the Group B match between the United States and Wales when it emerged that female (though not male) Wales fans and Football Association of Wales staff (including former Wales women's football captain Laura McAllister) had the items, which had been specially produced by the FAW to celebrate Wales return to the tournament after 64 years, confiscated by FIFA-Qatari officials outside the stadium ahead of the game. Former Wales players Danny Gabbidon and Ashley Williams had also worn "Spirit of 58" bucket hats on television when Wales qualified for the tournament in June 2022.

Regional names and variations

 In Bulgaria it is popular as "idiotka", which means "idiot hat".
In Australia the version worn by the Australian Defence Force is referred as a "Giggle Hat".
In Israel, it is known as a tembel hat or "Rafael hat", after Rafael Eitan, an Israeli general, politician, and former Chief of Staff of the Israel Defense Forces, who used to wear one. A similar type of hat called a tembel hat is dubbed the national hat of Israel as it was worn by Israeli Halutzim to protect from sunburn.
In Sweden, it is known as a "Beppehatt" or "Beppemössa", since Beppe Wolgers, a Swedish author and artist, used to wear it and made it popular in the 1970s.
In Denmark, it is known as "bøllehat" (troublemaker hat) since the 1880s, when a group of young delinquents would gather every Sunday in Bøllemosen in Jægersborg Dyrehave, from where they made trips to a popular dance restaurant in Charlottenlund to steal the ladies' hats.
In Argentina, it is known as "sombrero Piluso" (Piluso hat).
In Russia, it is called "panama". The name came from misconception of panama hat, known as hat of Ecuadorian workers in Panama.
In South Africa, it is known as an "ispoti" and is very popular with urban black youth, representing being streetwise without copying foreign hip-hop trends.
In Tanzania, it is very popular among elders, especially among the Iraqw people.
In the US, a similar hat is used officially by the US Navy for enlisted service dress uniforms, commonly referred to as a Dixie Cup hat, as in the manufacturer brand of paper cups.
In France, it is called a "Bob". 
In Germany, it is called "Anglerhut" (fisher's hat). It is popular as an accessoire in German hip hop. In 2018, a right-wing protester wearing a bucket hat in the colors of the Flag of Germany became notorious as a "Hutbürger" ("hat citizen"), a play on words of "Wutbürger" or "enraged citizen".
In the UK, it is sometimes called "Reni hat", after Stone Roses drummer Reni who frequently wore the hat.

In popular culture

Both fictional characters Inspector Clouseau from The Pink Panther film series and Detective Lieutenant Louie Provenza of the television series The Closer and Major Crimes frequently wear bucket hats: for Peter Sellers' portrayal of Clouseau, a grayish-shade Irish tweed fabric variety, with Provenza wearing a white bucket hat while at crime scenes.
 During the 1990s Liam Gallagher, lead vocalist of the rock band Oasis, has been photographed multiple times wearing a bucket hat.

See also
 Boonie hat
 Wales bucket hat

References

External links
 
 

Hats
1900s fashion
1910s fashion
1920s fashion
1930s fashion
1940s fashion
1950s fashion
1960s fashion
1990s fashion
2000s fashion
2010s fashion
Irish clothing
Maritime culture